Carl Ivar Orgland (13 October 1921 – 16 June 1994) was a Norwegian philologist, lexicographer, translator and poet. He is especially known for his work with Icelandic culture, and language and literature.

Academic career
He was born in Oslo, finished his secondary education in 1939, and graduated with a Cand.mag. degree in 1946 and a Cand.philol. degree in 1949. From 1950 onwards, he worked at the University of Iceland  as a research fellow until 1952 and then lecturer in the Norwegian language. He left the University of Iceland in 1960, and after two years as a high school teacher in Notodden, he became a lecturer in Norwegian at Lund University from 1962 to 1969. In 1969, he also received a Dr.philos.degree. The doctorate, on the subject of Stefán frá Hvítadal, was taken at the University of Iceland, and Orgland was the first foreigner to do so. From 1969 to 1973 he was a lecturer at the Oslo Teachers' College, and from 1973 to 1979 he was a lecturer in the Icelandic language at the University of Oslo.

Writings
He became known for translating Nordic works to Nynorsk, especially Icelandic—both medieval and modern—but also from the more obscure Faroese language and Modern Gutnish. Anthologies include Islandske dikt frå Solarljod til opplysningstid, Islandske gullalderdikt and Islandske dikt frå vårt hundreår. For his body of work he won the Bastian Prize, awarded by the Norwegian Association of Literary Translators, in 1986. He also issued several original works of poetry, having debuted in 1950 with the work Lilje og sverd ('Lily and Sword'). He has also written Norwegian-Icelandic dictionaries. During his younger days, he was also a tenor singer.

He was decorated with the Commander Cross of the Icelandic Order of the Falcon. He lived in Asker for the later part of his life, and died in 1994.

References

1921 births
1994 deaths
Norwegian philologists
Norwegian lexicographers
Academic staff of the University of Iceland
Academic staff of Lund University
Academic staff of Oslo University College
Academic staff of the University of Oslo
Norwegian expatriates in Iceland
Norwegian expatriates in Sweden
20th-century Norwegian poets
Norwegian male poets
Nynorsk-language writers
Recipients of the Order of the Falcon
20th-century Norwegian translators
20th-century Norwegian male writers
20th-century philologists
20th-century lexicographers